Julia De Angelis  is an Australian soccer player playing for Indiana Hoosiers. She has previously played for Canberra United in the Australian W-League.

College career
De Angelis joined the Indiana Hoosiers in February 2016.

References

External links 
 SoccerWay profile
 

1989 births
Living people
Australian women's soccer players
Women's association football midfielders
Canberra United FC players
A-League Women players
Indiana Hoosiers women's soccer players